This is a list of international prime ministerial trips made by Giorgia Meloni, who is serving as the 60th and current Prime Minister of Italy since 22 October 2022.

Trips 
2022

2023

Future trips 
The following international trips are scheduled to be made by Giorgia Meloni:

References 

Giorgia Meloni
2022 in international relations
Italian prime ministerial visits
Lists of diplomatic trips